MMII is a DJ mix mixed by John Digweed and released on Bedrock Records.  Progressive-Sounds calls it a "cornucopia of sound" and a mix of "dark, spacey grooves".

Track listing 
 Pollon - "Lonely Planet"  – 7:09
 Pole Folder & CP - "Dust"  – 8:19
 Bermuda Triangle - "Mooger Fooger"  – 5:32
 Sean Q6 - "Of Course"  – 4:59
 Flash Brothers - "Protect The Sense"  – 4:48
 108 Grand - "Te Quiero (Darren Emerson Remix)"  – 9:21
 Shakespear's Sister - "Black Sky (Dub Extravaganza part 2)"  – 8:20
 James Holden - "I Have Put Out The Light"  – 4:43
 Spooky - "Belong (Vocal Club Mix)"  – 8:54
 Mandalay - "Deep Love (Charlie May Remix)"  – 8:58

References

External links 
 

John Digweed albums
2002 compilation albums
DJ mix albums
Bedrock Records albums